This article lists the major power stations located in Jilin province.

Non-renewable

Coal-based

Renewable

Hydroelectric

conventional

Pumped-storage

References 

Power stations
Jilin